You 'n' Me is a 1960 album by the Zoot Sims and Al Cohn quintet.

Reception

Scott Yanow on Allmusic.com gave the album three stars out of five. Yanow commented on the "Improvisation for Unaccompanied Saxophones", describing it as "...a short but effective two-tenor workout that, through a clever arrangement by Cohn, gives one the impression that both saxophonists are using circular breathing." Yanow also said of the album that "...the co-leaders stick to their main instruments and enjoy swinging..."

Track listing
 "The Note" (Al Cohn) - 4:11	
 "You'd Be So Nice to Come Home To" (Cole Porter) - 4:51
 "You 'n' Me" (Cohn) - 4:40
 "On the Alamo" (Isham Jones, Gus Kahn) - 4:36
 "The Opener" (Bill Potts) - 3:45
 "Angel Eyes" (Earl Brent, Matt Dennis) - 3:17
 "Awful Lonely" (George Handy) - 4:19
 "Love for Sale" (Porter) - 4:59
 "Improvisation for Unaccompanied Saxophones" (Cohn, Zoot Sims) - 2:24

Personnel
Performance
Al Cohn - clarinet, tenor saxophone
Zoot Sims
Mose Allison - piano
Major Holley - double bass
Osie Johnson - drums

Production
Ken Druker - executive producer
Leonard Feather - liner notes, original recording producer
Dave Frishberg - liner notes
Paul J. Hoeffler - photography
Peter Keepnews - notes editing
Hollis King - art direction
Bryan Koniarz - producer
Kevin Reeves - mastering
Cynthia Sesso - photo research
Mark Smith - production assistant
Sherniece Smith - art producer
Chuck Stewart - photography
Isabelle Wong - design

References

1960 albums
Al Cohn albums
Zoot Sims albums
Collaborative albums
EmArcy Records albums